Miss Republic of South Africa (known as Miss RSA) was a national multi-raced Beauty pageant in South Africa. The titleholders were sent to compete in Miss Universe pageant from 1975 to 1981. The pageant was owned by South African Rapport.

History
In 1975, The publisher of the newspaper Rapport created the multi-raced pageant in the then-Apartheid South Africa to blend in the ladies from all races.

Titleholders
Color key

Miss Republic of South Africa existed between 1975 and 1981.

References

South Africa
South Africa
Recurring events established in 1952
1952 establishments in South Africa
South African awards